Never Dance Alone; filmed under the working title "Aerobic Girls", is a Hong Kong television modern inspiration comedy-drama series produced and broadcast by domestic broadcaster TVB in 2014, starring Carman Lee, Rachel Lee, Fennie Yuen, Flora Chan, Gloria Yip, Angie Cheong and Elvina Kong as the main cast. It is a remake of a 2011 South Korean film Sunny.

Synopsis
The series revolves around a group of six women: Siu-Sze, Julie, Akina, Yuen Chau, Jenny, and Cyndi, with regular flashbacks to their secondary school days in mid-1980s Hong Kong. The school is named St. Laurent Girls' Secondary School, a pun on the French designer Yves Saint Laurent (Yves' Chinese name is translated as sing3 lo4 laan4 in Cantonese, which is also a pun on TVB's veteran actress Helena Law Lan.) During their secondary school days, the six women formed a tight-knit dancing group called "M Club", based on the theory of menstrual synchrony, as well as a desire and hope for other "M"s in life in the years to come: good memories, marriage, and wealth (money).

Due to various events, as well as progression in life, the six women drifted away. Before that happened, the group mocked and eventually kicked out another woman: Diana, who then went on to hold a grudge against the rest of M Club.

Over two decades after their graduation, the women lead different lives. Siu-Sze is a housewife, as well as Akina. Yuen Chau works for the Hong Kong Government, while having an affair with a prospective chief executive candidate who is also her boss. Jenny initially worked as an airline hostess, but eventually quit to care for her mother, who suffered a stroke. Julie became obsessed with money, and was set to marry the son of a wealthy New Territories tribal elder until she discovered he is gay. Meanwhile, Cyndi continued with her passion for dancing, and operates a dance studio that is ailing.

Through happenstance, Cyndi reunited with Julie and Siu-Sze, and managed to bring the entire M Club back together through a stint at a psychiatric hospital, with Siu-Sze and others reuniting to help preserve Cyndi's dance studio. This helped the women rediscover their dream, as well as their purpose in life.

Production
Great effort was made in recruiting the two main casts: the modern cast, as well as their counterpart during the characters' secondary school days. TV host Eric Tsang, who produced the series in his producer debut, used his personal connections to assemble a cast of former TVB artists for the modern cast, most of whom have not appeared in a TVB series for a long time.  The younger cast was matched for physical resemblance and the ability to portray the characters during their secondary school days. One of the filming locations of the series is New Asia Middle School.

Cast

Main characters
Carman Lee as Mo Siu-Sze
Anjaylia Chan as teenage Mo Siu-Sze
Rachel Lee as Julie Chu Lei
Venus Wong as teenage Julie
Fennie Yuen as Luk Yuen-Chau
Cheronna Ng as teenage Luk Yuen-Chau
Flora Chan as Diana Yung Dan-Dan
Jeannie Chan as teenage Diana
Gloria Yip as Akina Leung Kam-Yin 
Kandy Wong as teenage Akina
Angie Cheong as Jenny Hui Chun-Nei 
Winki Lai as teenage Jenny
Elvina Kong as Cyndi Law Fung-Sin
Annice Ng as teenage Cyndi
Lawrence Ng as Alan Yiu Tsz-Lun, Diana's ex-husband.
Matthew Ho as teenage Alan

Other characters

Siu Sze's family
Lawrence Cheng as Wong Kwok-Leung, Siu-Sze's husband
Heidi Lee as Wong Ho, Siu-Sze's daughter
Miu Gam Fung as Wong Chiu Wing Mui, Siu-Sze's mother-in-law
David Lo as Mo Wah, Siu-Sze and Chi-kin’s father
Steven Cheung as Mo Chi-Kin, Siu-Sze's little brother and Carrie Tong's boyfriend

Julie's Family
Eliza Sam as Carrie Tong, originally named "Lorelei" and Julie's biological daughter, but estranged shortly after her birth.
Joe Cheng as Robert Poon, Julie's husband and Carrie's biological father
Amigo Choi as teenage Robert Poon
Pal Sinn as Lek Lek, Julie's ex-fiance.
King Kong Lee as Tim, Lek Lek's assistant and lover.

Jenny's Family
Rosanne Lui as Hui Sin, Jenny's mother
Luk Wing from FAMA as Fok Gam Fai, Jenny's boyfriend

Miscellaneous characters
Koo Ming-wah as Yue Dai Hung, Akina’s husband.
Koni Lui as Mandy, Diana’s assistant.
Anderson Junior as Law Fook-Chuen, Cyndi's half-brother.
Dolby Kwan as teenage Law Fook-Chuen
Patrick Dunn as LY Lee, Luk Yuen-Chau's supervisor, secret lover, and immediate supervisor. A prospective candidate for Hong Kong's chief executive.
Lily Poon as Mrs. Lee, LY Lee's legitimate wife.
Alan Wan as Jason, Carrie's friend.
Brian Burrell as Dr. House, Akina's new boyfriend at the end.
Eric Tsang as himself, appearing in the finale as a television producer to ask Siu-Sze to write a script for a TV series based on their experience (essentially, a script for Never Dance Alone)

Viewership ratings

See also
Sunny (2011 film)

References

External links
Official Website
K-TVB.net

TVB dramas
2014 Hong Kong television series debuts
2014 Hong Kong television series endings
Television remakes of films
Live action television shows based on films